KMUC (90.5 FM) is a radio station broadcasting a classical music format. Licensed to Columbia, Missouri, United States, the station is currently owned by the University of Missouri. 

The program Mizzou Music runs weekly featuring interviews and performances by faculty and students of the University of Missouri School of Music.

History 
In November 2014, owner Stephens College announced it would sell the then-KWWC-FM to the University of Missouri, which already owned NPR member station KBIA (91.3). Once the sale was completed, the classical music format heard on KBIA during the daytime was moved to 90.5, while the 91.3 signal would have a news/talk/information format similar to sister stations KWMU in St. Louis and KCUR-FM in Kansas City. The call letters were also to be changed to KMUC. 

The station changed its call sign to KMUC on October 29, 2015 and changed their format to classical music on October 31, 2015.

References

External links

University of Missouri
MUC